The 1932–33 season in Swedish football, starting August 1932 and ending July 1933:

Honours

Official titles

Competitions

Promotions, relegations and qualifications

Promotions

Relegations

Domestic results

Allsvenskan 1932–33

Allsvenskan promotion play-off 1932–33

Division 2 Norra 1932–33

Division 2 Östra 1932–33

Division 2 Västra 1932–33

Division 2 Södra 1932–33

National team results 

 Sweden: 

 Sweden: 

 Sweden: 

 Sweden: 

 Sweden: 

 Sweden: 

 Sweden: 

 Sweden: 

 Sweden:

National team players in season 1932/33

Notes

References 
Print

Online

 
Seasons in Swedish football